Simon Charles Kunz (born 15 October 1962) is an actor on stage and screen.

Early life
He attended Latymer Upper School, then completed a degree in Theatre Studies at the University of Warwick.

Career
He appeared in The Parent Trap as Martin in one of his first roles in film. He appeared as a lead character in the first two seasons of the BBC/BBC America/Netflix historical television drama, The Last Kingdom.

Of his stage performances, his role as Max in Address Unknown (2013) at the Soho Theatre, London, was described as a "superb performance" of a "study in dawning agony".

Filmography

Selected filmography

TV

Theatre
Comedians 
Blood and Gifts
55 Days
Address Unknown, Soho Theatre (2013)

References

External links

Living people
Alumni of the University of Warwick
American expatriates in England
American male television actors
American male stage actors
American male film actors
People educated at Latymer Upper School
1962 births